National Highway 6, commonly referred to as NH 6, is a primary national highway in India. The highway passes through the Indian states of Meghalaya, Assam, and Mizoram. Before renumbering of national highways NH-6 was variously numbered as old national highways 40, 44, 154 & 54.

Route 
NH6 links Jorabat, Shillong, Jowai, Badarpur, Panchgram, Kolasib, Kanpui, Aizawl, Seling, Lumtui, Khawthlir, Tuisen, Neihdawn, Champhai and terminates near Zokhawthar at India/Myanmar border.
In sept 2008, a 120 meter long tunnel was built at Sonapur in Meghalaya inside the Narpuh Sanctuary northwest of Silchar, it connects Meghalaya with Assam's Barak Valley in Meghalaya's southeast.

Junctions  
 
  Terminal near Jorabat.
  near Shillong
  near Jowai
  near Kolasib.
  near Aizawl.
  near Selling.
  near Kawlkulh

Asian Highways
Jorabat to Shillong stretch of National Highway 6 is part of Asian Highway 1 and Asian Highway 2.

See also 
 List of National Highways in India
 List of National Highways in India by state

References

External links 
 NH 6 on OpenStreetMap

AH1
National highways in India
National Highways in Assam
National Highways in Meghalaya
National Highways in Mizoram